Leo Palin (born 20 October 1956) is a retired professional tennis player from Finland.

During his career on the ATP Tour, Palin won one doubles title, and reached one singles and one other doubles final. He reached career-high rankings of No. 92 in singles (in 1982) and No. 111 in doubles (in 1986).

ATP Tour finals

Singles (1 loss)

Doubles (1 win, 1 loss)

See also
List of Finland Davis Cup team representatives

References

External links
 
 
 

1956 births
Living people
Finnish male tennis players
Sportspeople from Helsinki